Genea harknessii is a species of Genea truffle-like ascocarp fungi in the family Pyronemataceae. The species was described by Helen Gilkey in 1916. G. harknessii grows underground in forests, especially white oak forests, but also in coniferous forests. The mature fruit has a convoluted, brain-like appearance and often is no larger than an adult's thumbnail. The exterior is dark brown (to nearly black) with a hollow interior. The flesh between the dark interior and exterior 'skin' is white to pale grey.

References 

Pyronemataceae